Nina Henrichovna Genke or Nina Henrichovna Genke-Meller, or Nina Henrichovna Henke-Meller (19 April 1893 – 25 July 1954) was a Ukrainian-Russian avant-garde artist, (Suprematist, Futurist), designer, graphic artist and scenographer.

Biography

Nina Genke was born in Moscow in 1893 to a Dutch father, Genrikh Genke, and a Russian mother, Nadezhda Tikhanova. She married the artist Vadym Meller (1884-1962).

Nina Genke-Meller died in Kyiv in 1954.

Education

In 1912, she graduated from Levandovskaya Private Gymnasium in Kyiv. She received a title to teach Russian language and history. In Skoptsi, she met the artist Yevgenia Pribylska who headed the Art Studio in a Folk Center and became more inspired to become an artist herself. In 1914 Genke began attending Aleksandra Ekster’s studio in Kyiv for her art education, becoming an assistant in Ekster's studio from 1915 to 1917. At the same time, she worked as an artist in Skoptsi (Skoptsy) Village Folk Centre, supervised by Yevgeniya Pribilskaya and in the Verbovka Village Folk Centre, founded by N. Davidova.

Work

Nina Genke was closely connected with the Supremus group that was led by Kazimir Malevich, the founder of Suprematism. From 1915 Genke worked as a head and a chief artist of the Verbovka Village Folk Centre (province in Kiev). She attracted famous avant-garde artists such as Kazimir Malevich, Nadezhda Udaltsova, Aleksandra Ekster, Ivan Kliun, Ivan Puni, Lyubov Popova, Olga Rozanova, Ksenia Boguslavskaya and others to the creative peasant artisans co-operative. 1915-1916 she participated in the creating settings for the play "Kamira Kifared" (I.F. Annenskiy) for Kamerny Theater in Moscow, was teaching drawing at Kruger's Private Gymnasium, was working jointly on a large panel with artist Katria Vasilieva,as a member of the Kyiv Folk Centre, was one of the heads of the Kyiv Committee of the All-Russian Zemstvo Union: together with the group of artists-suprematists was creating a network of artistic and industrial studios aiming at support of folk art in Ternopil, Kolomiya, Chortkiv and Chernivtsi regions.

Shortly after the October Revolution of 1917, Nina Genke participated in decorating the streets of Kyiv and Odesa for Revolution Festivities together with Aleksandra Ekster and Kliment Red'ko, and began to design grandiose shows and a book on graphic design. Genke was a chief artist of the Golfstream futuristic publishing house led by Ukrainian poet-Futurist, Mykhail Semenko. At the same time she worked as a graphic artist. In 1923, she "illustrated the Panfuturists' October Collection, established a symbiosis between poster and poetry". From 1920 to 1924 she taught art in the All-Ukrainian State Center Studio. In 1924 moved to Moscow, working as a stage designer, designer for china (mostly plates) and wallpaper manufacture. Genke also held a position of the Deputy Head of the Board on Fine Arts in Vserabis. In later life, Genke worked as an interior designer, a scenographer, and supervisor of decorative and applied arts institutions.

References

Further reading 

Sergei Papeta, Nina Henke: From Folk Suprematism to Avant-gardism of Shows and Plays, pp. 48–66, Exhibition Catalogue, Avant-Garde Adventures, National Art Museum of Ukraine, Kyiv, Ukraine, 2004.
Nina Genke: Avantgarde and Ukraine, p. 193, Exhibition Catalogue, Villa Stuck, Munich, Germany, 1993.Nina Genke: Ukrainian Avant-garde of 1910-1930s, Zagreb, Croatia, 1991.Nina Henke-Meller and Ukrainian Futurism , Ilnytzkyj, Oleh S., Pages 292-296, International Yearbook of Futurism Studies. Multi-volumed work. Volume 5. International Yearbook of Futurism Studies. Ed. by Berghaus, Günter, 2015.
Dmytro Horbachov, ed., Ukrainian Avant-garde Art 1910-1930s, "Mystetstvo," Kyiv, Ukraine, 1996.
John E. Bowlt, ed., Crossroads: Modernism in Ukraine, Exhibition Catalogue, Chicago Cultural Center, Chicago, and The Ukrainian Museum, New York, 2006-2007.
 "Avant-Garde Art in Ukraine 1910-1930 Contested Memory", Myroslav Shkandrij, Academic Studies Press, Boston, 2019.Breaking the Rules. The Printed Face of the European Avant Garde 1900-1937, edited by Stephen Bury, published by British Library on the occasion of the exhibition at the British Library: Breaking the Rules'', London, 2007.

1893 births
1954 deaths
20th-century Ukrainian women artists
20th-century Russian women artists
20th-century Russian painters
Russian avant-garde
Russian people of Dutch descent
Modern artists
Russian designers
Ukrainian artists
Suprematism (art movement)